The Mehadica is a right tributary of the river Belareca in Romania. It discharges into the Belareca near the village Mehadia.

References

Rivers of Romania
Rivers of Caraș-Severin County